Alfons Novickis (1906 - 3 November 1931 in Riga) was a Latvian footballer.

Biography

Novickis rose to fame as a great footballing talent aged just 15 when he worked as a paper-boy at a publishing company. His first senior football club was LNJS Riga for which he played in 1926. In 1928 Novickis played with RFK and then joined Riga Vanderer, the club for which he played the best and last years of his career. On 27 July 1929 Novickis made his international debut for Latvia. In total Novickis played 9 international matches for Latvia national football team between 1929 and 1931.

Just as quickly as Novickis' star had risen in Latvian football, he fell down. After a 0–6 loss to Sweden in a friendly match on 26 July 1931 Novickis along with several other Latvian internationals made a bad public appearance under alcohol on the way back to Riga and as a result of it Novickis and Alberts Tauriņš were disqualified by the Latvian Football Federation for a year.

In the autumn of 1931 Novickis joined the army and on 3 November he committed suicide by shooting himself. It was later speculated that Novickis had killed himself because of some unknown disease and alcohol.

References

1906 births
1931 suicides
Latvian footballers
Latvia international footballers
Footballers from Riga
Association football midfielders
Suicides by firearm
Suicides in Latvia